Pentylenetetrazol, also known as pentylenetetrazole, leptazol, metrazol, pentetrazol (INN), pentamethylenetetrazol, Corazol, Cardiazol, Deumacard, or PTZ, is a drug formerly used as a circulatory and respiratory stimulant. High doses cause convulsions, as discovered by Hungarian-American neurologist and psychiatrist Ladislas J. Meduna in 1934. It has been used in convulsive therapy, and was found to be effective—primarily for depression—but side effects such as uncontrolled seizures were difficult to avoid. In 1939, pentylenetetrazol was replaced by electroconvulsive therapy, which is  easier to administer,  as the preferred method for inducing seizures in England's mental hospitals.  In the US, its approval by the Food and Drug Administration was revoked in 1982. It is used in Italy as a cardio-respiratory stimulant in combination with codeine in a cough suppressant drug.

Mechanism
The mechanism of pentylenetetrazol is not well understood, and it may have multiple mechanisms of action. In 1984, Squires et al. published a report analyzing pentylenetetrazol and several structurally related convulsant drugs. They found that in vivo convulsant potency was strongly correlated to in vitro affinity to the picrotoxin binding site on the GABA-A receptor complex. Many GABA-A ligands, such as the sedatives diazepam and phenobarbital, are effective anticonvulsants, but presumably pentylenetetrazol has the opposite effect when it binds to the GABA-A receptor.

Several studies have focused on the way pentylenetetrazol influences neuronal ion channels. A 1987 study found that pentylenetetrazol increases calcium influx and sodium influx, both of which depolarize the neuron. Because these effects were antagonized by calcium channel blockers,  pentylenetetrazol apparently acts at calcium channels, and it causes them to lose selectivity and conduct sodium ions, as well.

Research
Pentylenetetrazol has been used experimentally to study seizure phenomena and to identify pharmaceuticals that may control seizure susceptibility. For instance, researchers can induce status epilepticus in animal models. Pentylenetetrazol is also a prototypical anxiogenic drug and has been extensively used in animal models of anxiety. Pentylenetetrazol produces a reliable discriminative stimulus, which is largely mediated by the GABAA receptor. Several classes of compounds can modulate the pentylenetetrazol discriminative stimulus, including 5-HT1A, 5-HT3, NMDA, glycine, and L-type calcium channel ligands.

See also
 List of investigational sleep drugs
 GABAA receptor negative allosteric modulator
 GABAA receptor § Ligands

References

Antidepressants
Stimulants
GABAA receptor negative allosteric modulators
Withdrawn drugs
Respiratory agents
Convulsants
Tetrazoles